Julio Murillo (born 1957) is a Spanish writer. Born in Sao Paulo, Brazil to Spanish parents, he moved to Spain as a child. He has worked variously as a journalist, publicist, radio producer, marketing manager and creative consultant. He is best known as a historical novelist, and his six novels in this genre (starting with Las lágrimas de Karseb) have all bee well-received. He won the Premio de Novela Histórica Alfonso X El Sabio in 2008 for his novel Shangri-la. La cruz bajo la Antártida.

He currently lives in Santa María de Palautordera.

Awards
 2005 - Nominated for the Premio de Novela Histórica Alfonso X El Sabio for Las lágrimas de Karseb: Constantinopla 1453
 2008 - Winner of Premio de Novela Histórica Alfonso X El Sabio for Shangri-la. La cruz bajo la Antártida
 2008 - Nominated for the IV Edición del Premio Novela Histórica Ciudad de Zaragoza for El agua y la tierra

References

Spanish writers
1957 births
Living people